William Pulteney, 1st Earl of Bath,  (22 March 16847 July 1764) was a British Whig politician who sat in the House of Commons from 1707 to 1742, when he was created the first Earl of Bath by King George II.

Bath is sometimes stated to have been First Lord of the Treasury and British prime minister, for the shortest term ever (two days) in 1746, although most modern sources do not consider him to have held the office.

Background and early career
The son of William Pulteney by his first wife, Mary Floyd, he was born in March 1684 into an old Leicestershire family. He was educated at Westminster School and at Christ Church, Oxford, matriculating on 31 October 1700. He acquired extensive classical knowledge, and on leaving Oxford made the usual tour on the continent. In 1705, he was brought into parliament by Henry Guy (former secretary of the Treasury) for the Yorkshire borough of Hedon.  This seat was held by him without a break until 1734.

Throughout the reign of Queen Anne William Pulteney played a prominent part in the struggles of the Whigs, and was involved in the prosecution of Henry Sacheverell. When the victorious Tories sent his friend Robert Walpole to the Tower of London in 1712, Pulteney championed his cause in the House of Commons and with the leading Whigs visited him in prison.

Ministerial offices

Pulteney was secretary of war from 1714 to 1717 in the first ministry of George I, and was on the committee of secrecy on the Treaty of Utrecht, formed in April 1715. Two years later, on 6 July 1716, he became one of the privy council. When Townshend was dismissed, in April 1717, from his post of Lord Lieutenant of Ireland, and Walpole resigned, they were followed in their retirement by Pulteney. 

The crash of the South Sea Company restored Walpole to the highest position, but all he offered to Pulteney was a peerage. Pulteney rejected the offer, but in May 1723 Pulteney agreed to accept the lucrative but insignificant post of Cofferer of the Household. However, when he found himself neglected, he opposed the proposition of Walpole to discharge the debts of the civil list, and in April 1725 was dismissed from his sinecure.

He was one of the original backers of the Royal Academy of Music, establishing a London opera company which commissioned numerous works from Handel, Bononcini and others.

Patriot Whigs
From the day of his dismissal to that of his ultimate triumph, Pulteney remained in opposition, forming the Patriot Whigs, a group of fellow Whigs who felt that Walpole was corrupt and tyrannical. Walpole's attempt's 1730 at conciliation with the offer of Townshend's place and of a peerage was spurned. Pulteney's resentment was not confined to his speeches in parliament. 

With Bolingbroke he started, in December 1726, a periodical called The Craftsman, and in its pages the minister was incessantly denounced for many years. Lord Hervey published an attack on the Craftsman, and Pulteney, either openly or behind the person of Amhurst, its editor, replied to the attack. Whether the question at issue was the civil list, the excise, the income of the Prince of Wales, or the state of domestic affairs, Pulteney was ready with a pamphlet, and the minister or one of his friends came out with a reply. 

For his "Proper reply to a late scurrilous libel" (Craftsman, 1731), an answer to "Sedition and defamation displayed," he was challenged to a duel by Lord Hervey; for another, "An answer to one part of an infamous libel entitled remarks on the Craftsman's indication of his two honourable patrons," he was in July 1731 struck off the roll of privy councillors and dismissed from the commission of the peace in several counties. 

In print, Pulteney was inferior to Bolingbroke alone among the antagonists of Walpole, but in parliament, from which Bolingbroke was excluded, he excelled. When the sinking fund was appropriated in 1733 he led the denunciation; when the excise scheme in the same year was stirring popular feeling to its lowest depths the passion of the multitude broke out in his oratory. Walpole managed to avoid the fall of his ministry. Bolingbroke withdrew to France on the suggestion, it is said, of Pulteney, and the opposition was weakened by the dissensions of the leaders.

From the general election of 1734 until his elevation to the peerage, Pulteney sat for Middlesex. For some years after this election the minister's assailants made little progress in their attack, but in 1738 the troubles with Spain supplied them with the opportunity which they desired. Walpole long argued for peace, but he was feebly supported by his own cabinet, and the frenzy of the people for war knew no bounds. In an evil moment for his own reputation he consented to remain in office and to gratify popular passion with a war against Spain. His downfall was not long deferred. War was declared in 1739, a new parliament was summoned in the summer of 1741, and over the divisions on the election petitions the ministry of Walpole collapsed.

The task of forming the new administration was after some delay entrusted to Pulteney, who offered the post of First Lord of the Treasury (Prime Minister) to the Earl of Wilmington, and contented himself with a seat in the cabinet and a peerage, still hoping to retain his supremacy in the ministry. This made him unpopular, and his influence dwindled to nothing.

Horace Walpole asserts that when Pulteney wished to withdraw from the peerage it was forced upon him by the king, and another chronicler of the times records that when Walpole and Pulteney met in the House of Lords, the one as Earl of Orford, the other as Earl of Bath, the remark was made by Orford: "Here we are, my lord, the two most insignificant fellows in England." On 14 July 1742 Pulteney was created Baron Pulteney of Heydon, Viscount Pulteney of Wrington, Somerset, and Earl of Bath. On 20 February he had been restored to his rank in the privy council. At Wilmington's death in 1743 he made application to the king for the post of First Lord of the Treasury, only to find that it had been conferred on Henry Pelham.

Prime minister

On 10 February 1746, Pelham's administration resigned en masse, and the king turned to Bath to form an alternative ministry. He accepted the seals of office and made nominations to the most senior posts, but it quickly became clear that he did not have enough support to form a viable government, and after "48 hours, three quarters, seven minutes, and eleven seconds" he abandoned the attempt, forcing the king to accept Pelham's terms for resuming office. As the office of Prime Minister did not then officially exist, it is a matter of controversy whether Bath should be considered to have been Prime Minister by virtue of his two-day ministry.

Bath's failed attempt to form a government brought him much ridicule. Horace Walpole recorded the joke that "Granville and Bath were met going about the streets, calling 'Odd Man', as the hackney chairmen do when they want a partner", and a contemporary pamphlet satirically praised him for "the most wise and honest of all administrations, the minister having ... never transacted one rash thing; and, what is more marvellous, left as much money in the T[reasur]y as he found in it."

Death and legacy

An occasional pamphlet and an infrequent speech were afterwards the sole fruits of Bath's talents. His praises whilst in retirement have been sung by two bishops, Zachary Pearce and Thomas Newton. In 1762, two years before his death, he served as treasurer of the Salop Infirmary in Shrewsbury. He was buried on 17 July 1764, in his own vault in Islip chapel, Westminster Abbey. The monument is by the sculptor Joseph Wilton.

He married on 27 December 1714 Anna Maria, daughter and co-heiress of John Gumley of Isleworth, commissary general to the army who was often satirized by the wits of the day (Notes and Queries, 3rd S. iI. 40 2-403, ~ 490). Anna Maria was the aunt of  Rev. Dr. John Lockman, Canon of Windsor. She died on 14 September 1758, and their only son William Pulteney died unmarried at Madrid on 12 February 1763. Pulteney's vast fortune passed in 1767 to Frances, wife of William Johnstone and daughter and co-heiress of his cousin, Daniel Pulteney, a bitter antagonist of Walpole in parliament, and had taken the name of Pulteney.

Of business he was never fond, and the loss in 1734 of his trusted friend John Merrill, who had supplied the qualities which he lacked, was lamented by him in a letter to Jonathan Swift.

The town of Poultney, Vermont and the Poultney River were named for him.

Cabinet of Lord Bath

Bibliography
William Coxe, Memoirs of Sir Robert Walpole (1816), and of Henry Pelham (1829)
John Morley, Walpole (1889)
Walter Sichel, Bolingbroke (1901–1902)
Archibald Ballantyne, Carteret (1887)
Eng. Hist. Rev. iv. 749-753
and the general political memoirs of the time.

References

Attribution:

Bibliography

External links

 William Pulteney at the Eighteenth-Century Poetry Archive (ECPA)
 
 

1684 births
1764 deaths
Alumni of Christ Church, Oxford
British MPs 1707–1708
British MPs 1708–1710
British MPs 1710–1713
British MPs 1713–1715
British MPs 1715–1722
British MPs 1722–1727
British MPs 1727–1734
British MPs 1734–1741
British MPs 1741–1747
British duellists
Earls of Bath
Peers of Great Britain created by George II
Lord-Lieutenants of the East Riding of Yorkshire
Lord-Lieutenants of Shropshire
Members of the Parliament of Great Britain for English constituencies
Pulteney, William
Members of the Privy Council of Great Britain
People educated at Westminster School, London
People expelled from the Privy Council of Great Britain
Members of the Parliament of Great Britain for Hedon
Members of the Parliament of England for Hedon